Radyr Golf Club is a golf course in Radyr, northwestern Cardiff, Wales. It is the oldest existing golf club in Cardiff, established on 29 November 1902, following the breakup of Lisvane Golf Club, the preceding year.

History
In 1904 the club hosted the inaugural Welsh Professional Championship. In 1912 the parkland course was redesigned by Harry Colt, who overlooked further changes nine years later. In 1913, a fire gutted the original clubhouse, and was replaced by a building which still exists. In 1920 Rupert Phillips and Raymond Thomas played at the course. The golfers were bet that they could not play through from Radyr in Cardiff to the golf club at Southerndown, a distance of 20 miles. It took 608 strokes and 20 lost balls as well as being chased by a bull before they were able to collect the bet.

It has hosted the PGA Welsh National Championship  six times as of April 2016, the last of which was in July 2015.

Course
Laid out by the course designer Harry Colt, the Chairman of the 2010 Ryder Cup described it as "One of Colt's Little Jewels".

Trudy Carradice, in the book Golf in Wales: A Pictorial History described the course as follows:

Carradice further notes that the course offers fine views of Cardiff and the Seven Estuary.

Notes

References

External links
 

Golf clubs and courses in Wales
Sport in Cardiff
1902 establishments in the United Kingdom
1902 in Wales
Radyr